Saleem Sheikh (also spelled Saleem Shaikh) is a Pakistani film and television actor. He made his on-screen debut from PTV's Shama where he portrayed the younger version of Jawed Sheikh's character. He then appeared as child artist in PTV's children plays. He is best known for portraying GC Safeer in Shoaib Mansoor's military drama Sunehray Din. Sheikh made his film debut in 1992 with Mohabbat Ke Saudagar. His career saw a resurgence in 2010 when he played Abdul Hameed "Midu" in Anokha Ladla and in its sequels in the following years.

Filmography

Films
 Mohabat Ke Saudagar (1992)
 Duniya Dus Numberi (1993)
 Qasam (1993)
 Chief Saab (1996)
 Sangam (1997)
 Yes Boss (1997)
 Kaheen Pyar Na Hojaye (1998)
 Dil Sanbhala Na Jaye (1998)
 Aik Aur Love Story (1999)
 Yeh Dil Aap Ka Huwa (2002)
 Khulay Aasman Ke Neechay (2008)

Television

Awards 

 Bolan award for Best actor in Chief Sahb 1996
 Nigar award for Best supporting actor in Yeh Dil Aap Ka Huwa 2002
 Ptv Award for best supporting actor in (Dil Behkay Ga) 2012

See also 
 List of Lollywood actors

References

External links 
 
 Saleem Sheikh Updated Profile

Living people
Punjabi people
Pakistani male child actors
Pakistani male film actors
Pakistani male television actors
Nigar Award winners
1967 births
PTV Award winners